John Hubbs (20 November 1874 – 1 June 1952) was a Conservative member of the House of Commons of Canada. He was born in Wellington, Ontario and became a canner and manufacturer.

The son of Charles Hubbs and Margaret Baird, Hubbs attended secondary school at Picton, Ontario. He became owner of John Hubbs Canning Company.

He was first elected to Parliament at the Prince Edward riding in the 1921 general election. After riding boundary changes, Hubbs became a candidate at Prince Edward—Lennox for the 1925 election where he won re-election. Hubbs was re-elected there in 1926. After completing his third term in Parliament, Hubbs left federal politics and did not seek re-election in the 1930 vote.

References

External links
 

1874 births
1952 deaths
Conservative Party of Canada (1867–1942) MPs
Members of the House of Commons of Canada from Ontario
People from Prince Edward County, Ontario